AVI Global Trust is a London-based British investment trust. The company is a constituent of the FTSE 250 Index. The chairman is Graham Kitchen.

History 
The company was established in 1889 as the Transvaal Mortgage Loan and Finance Company, led by chairman W.J. Thompson. As the Transvaal Mortgage Loan and Finance Company, it invested in what is now South Africa.

The firm was renamed the British Empire Land Mortgage and Loan Company in 1906, British Empire Securities and General Trust Limited in 1964 and British Empire Trust in 2015, with the final name change to AVI Global Trust in 2019.

The firm's recent history dates to 1985, when Asset Value Investors, an employee-owned management company was established to manage the firm, then valued at £6 million.

Its goal of acquiring firms under NAV has led it to attempt takeovers of other investment trusts trading at a discount. In 1986, the company acquired Ashdown Investment Trust for £66 million. In 1989, it mounted a hostile takeover bid for Schroder Global Trust: it had been building up a stake in the target company over a two-year period. In 1995, it acquired the Selective Assets Trust (formerly the Edinburgh Assets Trust) for £42 million. It changed its name from British Empire Trust to AVI Global Trust in May 2019.

In 2016, the activist US hedge fund, Elliott Management Corporation, built up a large stake in the company. The investment was seen as one of Elliott's successful investment positions in the UK.

In 2019–20, the company invested heavily in SoftBank Group and other Japanese stocks. The company's strategy has been to take advantage of Softbank's share buyback programme. This has supported the company's market capitalisation on the London Stock Exchange which was £751 million in July 2020. It has also built up a significant holding in Pershing Square Holdings, a hedge fund.

ESG Investing 

AVI became signatories of the Principles for Responsible Investment (PRI) in April 2021.

References

Further reading

External links 
 
 

Investment trusts of the United Kingdom
British companies established in 1985
Financial services companies established in 1985
Companies listed on the London Stock Exchange